Habartice is a municipality and village in Liberec District in the Liberec Region of the Czech Republic. It has about 500 inhabitants. It lies on the border with Poland, adjoining the town of Zawidów.

Administrative parts
The village of Háj is an administrative part of Habartice.

References

External links

Villages in Liberec District